Ephestia is a genus of small moths belonging to the family Pyralidae. Some species are significant pests of dry plant produce, such as seeds and cereals. Best known among these are probably the cacao moth (E. elutella) and the Mediterranean flour moth (E. kuehniella).

The genus Cadra is closely related to Ephestia and might be a junior synonym. Several of these moths are variously assigned to one or the other genus, in particular in non-entomological sources.

Diversity

Species of Ephestia include:

 Ephestia abnormalella Ragonot, 1887
 Ephestia animella K.Nupponen & Junnilainen, 1998
 Ephestia callidella Guenée, 1845
 Ephestia calycoptila Meyrick, 1935
 Ephestia columbiella Neunzig, 1990 
 Ephestia cypriusella Roesler, 1965
 Ephestia disparella Hampson, 1901
 Ephestia elutella (Hübner, 1796) – cacao moth, tobacco moth, warehouse moth
 Ephestia inquietella Zerny, 1932
 Ephestia kuehniella (Zeller, 1879) – Mediterranean flour moth, Indian flour moth, mill moth
 Ephestia laetella Rebel, 1907
 Ephestia mistralella (Millière, 1874)
 Ephestia parasitella Staudinger, 1859
 Ephestia rectivittella Ragonot, 1901
 Ephestia subelutellum (Ragonot, 1901)
 Ephestia unicolorella Staudinger, 1881
 Ephestia welseriella (Zeller, 1848)

References

Phycitini
Pyralidae genera